Giovanni Francesco Giuseppe Malfatti, also known as Gian Francesco or Gianfrancesco (26 September 1731 – 9 October 1807) was an Italian mathematician. He was born in Ala, Trentino, Italy and died in Ferrara.

Malfatti studied at the College of San Francesco Saverio in Bologna where his mentors included Vincenzo Riccati, F. M. Zanotti and Gabriele Manfredi. He moved to Ferrara in 1754, and became a professor at the University of Ferrara when it was re-established in 1771. In 1782 he was one of the founders of the Societa Italiana delle Scienze, later to become the Accademia nazionale delle scienze detta dei XL.

Contributions to mathematics 

In 1803, Malfatti posed the problem of carving three circular columns out of a triangular block of marble, using as much of the marble as possible, and conjectured that three mutually-tangent circles inscribed within the triangle would provide the optimal solution. These tangent circles are now known as Malfatti circles after his work, despite the earlier work of Japanese mathematician Ajima Naonobu and of Malfatti's countryman Gilio di Cecco da Montepulciano on the same problem and despite the fact that the conjecture was later proven false. Several triangle centers derived from these circles are also named after both Ajima and Malfatti.

Additional topics in Malfatti's research concerned quintic equations, and the property of the lemniscate of Bernoulli that a ball rolling down an arc of the lemniscate, under the influence of gravity, will take the same time to traverse it as a ball rolling down a straight line segment connecting the endpoints of the arc.

Selected publications
.

Notes

References
 
 Leonardo Franchini, "La matematica e il gioco del lotto - Una biografia di Gianfrancesco Malfatti", Edizioni Stella, Rovereto, ottobre 2007.

External links
 Clark Kimberling's page on Malfatti
 Leonardo Franchini, "La matematica e il gioco del lotto - Una biografia di Gianfrancesco Malfatti", Edizioni Stella, Rovereto, ottobre 2007.

1731 births
1807 deaths
People from Ala, Trentino
18th-century Italian mathematicians
19th-century Italian mathematicians